Tartar was launched at Bristol in 1778. Initially she sailed, with some success, as a privateer. Then in 1781 she became a slave ship in the triangular trade in enslaved people. She made one complete voyage as an enslaving ship; French naval vessels captured Tartar on her second enslaving voyage.

Career
Tartar first appeared in Lloyd's Register (LR), in 1778.

The British Admiralty had given notice in April 1777, that they were ready to issue  letters of marque for privateers against the Americans. In March 1778, Great Britain broke off relations with France.

Tartar initially sailed as a privateer. Before Tartar sailed on her first and second cruises, her owners presented her captains with detailed instructions as to the conduct of the cruises.

On her first cruise, Tartar captured the American-built French brigantine Babet, which was sailing from Bordeaux to Martinique. Tartar was in company with another Bristol privateer, Albion, when they captured the snow Santa Maria. 

Tartar, in company with the privateer Alexander, captured Ferme, prior to end-September 1778. Ferme was an East Indiaman, and so a major prize. Reportedly, she had been insured in London for £100,000. She was also the only major prize that Bristol privateers captured in 1778.

They sent the prize into Kingroad, by Avonmouth. 

In December, Tartar was off Ushant when she encountered a French frigate of 36 guns. After an engagement of one-and-a-half hours, the frigate left. Tartar had three men killed and several men wounded.

Captain Aaron Floyd acquired a letter of marque on 6 March 1779.  

On 19 September 1779 Tartar engaged an American privateer armed with thirty 6 and 9-pounder guns for two hours before the American vessel sailed away. Tartar had suffered three men killed and 13 wounded. 

Next, Tartar captured St Antonio E. Almas, which was carrying tobacco from Ostend to Lisbon. Tartar sent her prize into King Road, off Avonmouth. The capture of St Antony Palmas, Sebastio Alfonso, master, took place on 24 September.   

New owners in late 1779 sailed Tartar as a slave ship. Captain James Fraser acquired a letter of marque on 17 December 1779. He sailed from Bristol on 13 March 1780 with a crew of 60 men. Tartar started acquiring captives at Cape Coast Castle on 23 November. She embarked 250 captives and sailed from Africa on 1 February 1781. She arrived at Barbados on 30 March. From there she sailed to Montego Bay, Jamaica. She arrived at the West Indies with 54 crew and discharged 28 at Barbados or Jamaica. Tartar sailed from Jamaica on 18 July, and arrived back at Bristol on 20 September 1781 with 26 crew members. On the way home she took on 40 tons of rice and 500 skins seized from a Spanish vessel that had been sailing from the Spanish Main to Havana.

{| class=" wikitable"
|-
! Year
! Master
! Owner
! Trade
! Source & notes
|-
| 1782
| Fraser
| J.Anderson
| Africa–BristolBristol–Africa
| LR''' lengthened 1782
|-
|}

Loss
Captain Fraser sailed from Bristol on 12 March 1782, with a crew of 40 men. Lloyd's List reported in August 1782 that a French vessel of 40 guns, a frigate, and a cutter had captured Tartar, of Bristol, Fraser, master, off the coast of Africa. Tartar had resisted and the capture only occurred after she had lost 10 men killed and a number of wounded. The French put Fraser and his surviving crews on Rose, of Liverpool, Stephenson, master, which the French had taken on about 9 June. The French made a cartel of Rose and she arrived at Bristol with some 200 men. Other reports state that the captors were a French frigate, sloop-of-war, and cutter, and that the casualties on Tartar'' amounted to three men killed and five wounded.

Notes

Citations

References
 

 
 

1778 ships
Ships built in Bristol
Age of Sail merchant ships of England
Privateer ships of Great Britain
Bristol slave ships
Captured ships